Lucas R. Doty (born October 26, 2001) is an American football quarterback for the South Carolina Gamecocks.

Early years
Doty attended Myrtle Beach High School where he was named South Carolina's Mr. Football in 2019.  In his senior year, he totaled 1,876 passing yards and 25 passing touchdowns, with an additional 408 rushing yards and 4 rushing touchdowns.

Doty committed to South Carolina after receiving 19 offers, including offers from Auburn and North Carolina.

College career

2020
Doty appeared in 7 games.  He completed 43 of 71 passes for 2 touchdowns and 3 interceptions.  He also rushed for 91 yards.

Doty originally only appeared in a specific package of plays designed for him, but took over as the starter for the final two games of the 2020 season.

2021
Doty injured his foot in the offseason, so he did not play in the first two games, instead serving as a backup to Zeb Noland. Doty later took over during the game against Georgia. He started the next four games, but then suffered a season-ending injury. Noland and graduate transfer Jason Brown would start at quarterback the remainder of the 2021 season.

Personal life 
Doty was born to Bobby and Melanie Doty.  Both of his parents were athletes at Erskine College.

Doty also has a younger brother, Jake, who is currently a quarterback at Myrtle Beach High School.

References

External links
 South Carolina bio

2001 births
Living people
American football quarterbacks
South Carolina Gamecocks football players